Guy Bourgeois (born February 26, 1958) is a Canadian politician. Bourgeois was elected to the National Assembly of Quebec in the 2014 election. He represents the electoral district of Abitibi-Est as a member of the Quebec Liberal Party.

References

Quebec Liberal Party MNAs
Living people
French Quebecers
People from Amos, Quebec
21st-century Canadian politicians
1958 births